Yassky is a surname. Notable people with the surname include: 

Chaim Yassky (1896–1948), physician and medical administrator in Jerusalem
David Yassky (born 1964), American university administrator and politician

See also
Yassy (disambiguation)